The women's freestyle 63 kg competition of the wrestling events at the 2011 Pan American Games in Guadalajara, Mexico, was held on October 22 at the CODE II Gymanasium.  The defending champion was Sara McMann from the United States.

This freestyle wrestling competition consisted of a single-elimination tournament, with a repechage used to determine the winner of two bronze medals. The two finalists faced off for gold and silver medals. Each wrestler who lost to one of the two finalists moved into the repechage, culminating in a pair of bronze medal matches featuring the semifinal losers each facing the remaining repechage opponent from their half of the bracket.

Each bout consisted of up to three rounds, lasting two minutes apiece. The wrestler who scored more points in each round was the winner of that rounds; the bout finished when one wrestler had won two rounds (and thus the match).

Schedule
All times are Central Standard Time (UTC-6).

Results

Main bracket

Repechage round
Two bronze medals were awarded.

References

Wrestling at the 2011 Pan American Games